Hatwar railway station is a railway station on Katihar–Siliguri branch of Howrah–New Jalpaiguri line in the Katihar railway division of Northeast Frontier Railway zone. It is situated beside National Highway 31, Pachim Lahil, Hatwar of Uttar Dinajpur district in the Indian state of West Bengal.

References

Railway stations in Uttar Dinajpur district
Katihar railway division